The United Union of Roofers, Waterproofers and Allied Workers (UURWAW or RWAW) is a union of roofers and waterproofing personnel, headquartered in Washington, D.C. , the union has approximately 22,000 members organized into nine district councils across the United States.

History
The current union has its roots in two separate predecessor organizations: the International Slate and Tile Roofers Union of America, which was chartered by the American Federation of Labor in 1903, and the International Brotherhood of Composition Roofers, Damp and Waterproof Workers, which was chartered by the AFL in 1906. The two groups merged in 1919 to form the United Slate, Tile and Composition Roofers, Damp and Waterproof Workers Association. The union changed to its current name in 1978.

References

External links
 
 About the Roofers
 History of the union

AFL–CIO
Roofing trade unions
Trade unions established in 1903
1903 establishments in the United States